Burkardroth is a municipality in the district of Bad Kissingen in Bavaria in Germany.

Geography
Burkardroth lies on the south boundary of the biosphere reserve Rhön about 14 km northwest of the district capital of Bad Kissingen. On the north, it borders on the district of Rhön-Grabfeld.

Divisions of the municipality
There are 12 towns in the municipality:
Burkardroth
Frauenroth
Gefäll
Katzenbach
Lauter
Oehrberg
Premich
Stangenroth
Stralsbach
Waldfenster
Wollbach
Zahlbach

History
The present municipality (Marktgemeinde) was created in 1972.

Sister cities
  Ense, district of Soest, North Rhine-Westphalia

Sightseeing
The most important architectural monuments are the church of St. Peter, which dates from the 17th century, and the chapel of the former Cistercian monastery of Frauenroth.

References

External links
 

Bad Kissingen (district)